The existence of pacifism in Germany has changed over time, with the consistent feature of having diverse groups with a shared belief in an opposition to participating in war. These movements both individually and collectively, have historically been small in their numbers and have not been well organised. With a culture of war in the early history of Germany, pacifism was not a culturally significant group. This was driven by the government as they attempted to use the media in order to promote the expansion of Germany as a growing empire. The exception to this is during the Cold War with the Bonn demonstration with a large turnout of around 300,000 people. Christian peace groups have been the most consistent groups within the classification of pacifists as an opposition to violence is a key part of their faith. The size, whilst remaining small varies over the history of the Federal Republic of Germany. The reception from the public regarding pacifists also changes depending on the historical period.

Historical Periods

Imperial Germany (1871–1914) 
With the unification of Germany as a single state, the country began to expand militarily as an international power, which in turn created a pacifist movement in Germany. This first movement was called the German Peace Society and was founded in 1892. However, the movement was small with only 10,000 active members at its peak, as it did not resonate with the wider population who was in favour of the German expansion. With relatively low support the ability of the movement to grow was limited to the ability to speak freely, which was later limited due to the government declaring a state of war. The rapid military expansion of Germany was also largely popular with the population. Prior to the outbreak of war the support of the movement began to decline as the public support of a war grew and also to avoid a response from the government. 

During this time there were two Hague Peace Conferences, which resulted in various multi-lateral treaties regarding military expansion and foreign policy. The conferences were also about establishing the universal values and therefore the obligations of states. In 1899 there was a Hauge Peace Conference, however, Germany did not attend, and it was not until the 1907 conference where Germany would participate. At this conference Germany was considered uncooperative, which was due to the restrictions on their ability to expand their military power. As Germany was a rising power there was a hesitation to reduce their expansion as it would restrict their self-defence capabilities.

World War One Germany (1914–1918) 
German Pacifism was not as organised in this era when compared to that of Cold War Germany; however, a large number of groups adopted pacifist attitudes, which evolved throughout the war. During this period a group of female war opponents emerged, which was a pacifist group who were opposed to the war as it was, according to this group, caused by masculine values and attitudes. This group also overlapped with the group of advocates for women’s’ rights during the same period, as well as the socialist movement. This activism from female groups was the result of changing cultural, political and social roles of women which had developed during the war. 

Early in the war attitudes towards war were very positive, which along with the conscription of German soldiers resulted in the pacifists’ movement remaining a relatively small group. As the country was in a state of war the government was heavily involved in censorship of the population. So, the pacifist publications were censored to not have views, which directly opposed the government. They rather would talk about the wider issue of war with other countries. The government remained lenient towards those with pacifist attitudes, which contrasts the government attitude of the Nazi Government and other governments, which enacted the concept of total war on the home front. 

In 1915 at the Hague, the Women's Peace Conference met to discuss methods to end the war through negotiations. Attending this event was four German delegates. After this conference, the government began to restrict pacifists and their groups as there was a consensus that this conference had weakened the position of Germany for negotiations. Towards the end of the war, the public support massively declines, which resulted in an increase in the support for pacifist ideas. Despite this the movement remained small in size. At this time the government tried to assert more control over the home front in order to provide more resources for soldiers on the front line. With the Russian Revolution, the pacifist movement also gained support and inspiration through the Marxist ideology behind the revolution. The literature during the war was restricted and the literature that was promoted all displayed similar views. These views support the war effort, which was achieved through the justification of the war, as well as the celebration of acts of heroism and sacrifice. Pacifist literature was virtually non-existent during this time period, which continued until the end of the war before it became more widely discussed in the literature.

World War Two Germany (1939–1945) 
The existence of pacifists in Germany is at its lowest and least organised during this time, as a result of the Nazi Government’s policies regarding movements which oppose their regime. Pacifists during this time are mostly individuals, who may not necessarily be a part of a formalised group, rather they act out the ideology of pacifism. A key reason for this was the continued support of the war effort as well as public support for the Fuhrer of Germany, Adolf Hitler remaining high throughout the war. This period was also when popular support for pacifism was at its lowest as there was significant support for the war effort. As Nazism was built on the outcome of the First World War, there was significant pro-war sentiment in the ideology as a means of resolving the issues which occurred after the war. This was in opposition to the pacifist ideology which was one reason for the Nazi response to Pacifist groups and individuals during the course of the Second World War. The atrocities of the Second World War also inspired the pacifist movement after the end of the war.

Cold War Germany (1945–1990) 
The pacifist movement was at its most popular during the Cold War era. This is evident as a peace protest at Bonn occurred in 1981 which was a demonstration against the production of nuclear weapons and the militarism of the NATO alliance system. The reason for the popularity was the outcome of the First and Second World War, as the significant loss of lives shifted the culture towards militarism in Germany. Another key issue which was protested was the ability of the United States government to use West German weapons without consulting the West German government. The event had approximately 300,000 people attend, which was a significant number for a pacifist event in West Germany, as it contrasts the historical size of the pacifist movements. This event was made up of 700 individual groups which protested together with the common link of the pacifist ideology. Another factor which influenced the size of the Bonn demonstration was the NATO plan to introduce intermediate-range theatre nuclear forces (INF) into Germany as a part of their military arsenal. This debate was a prominent part of West German discourse during 1957 and 1958. The main concerns around the policy were the implications for domestic and international responsibilities as a nuclear state. The SPD initially opposed this proposition; however, they made a concession to introduce a military without nuclear capabilities. The following election the SPD lost to the Christian Democrats, which resulted in the SPD reforming their party and their ideology. The part ideology after the reform, resembled Marxism as pacifism became an integral part of the party. Western Germany had a much greater presence of pacifists than Eastern Germany. Christian-moral ethics were the driver of the movement, however, not all pacifists were Christian. While these Christian movements and groups have historically been the only consistent pacifists, this era saw the rise in pacifists not from the Christian faith. From the 1960s, there was a significant increase in student protests as part of the pacifist movement. Unions were also another group which became heavily involved in pacifism during this time. Even during its most popular stage, pacifism was not a characteristic of either political wing. The policy of disarmament was also a heavily discussed policy at the time and the pacifist movement was advocating for the adoption of this policy.

Contemporary Germany (1990–Present) 
The foreign policy of Contemporary Germany has been more pacifist than those of the previous historical eras. This is driven primarily by the history of Germany during the First and Second World Wars, as there was a significant loss of lives as a result of the perception of pacifism by the wider population. The use of force rarely occurs unless there is a need for humanitarian intervention, which is derived from the United Nations principle of collective security. One example of the government use of pacifism is demonstrated in their response to the United States’ declaration of war on Iraq, as they were the first allied nation to condemn the decision and decide against participating in the war. This damaged bi-lateral relations between the nations and was a significant moment for modern German foreign policy and its reliance on pacifism. There was no bi-partisan support for pacifism as it was primarily linked to the left-wing parties, the Social Democratic Party of Germany (SPD) and The Greens. The German government also abstained from participating in Kosovo War which was another war NATO participated in without German military support. After the Rwandan Genocide and the Bosnian War, the left-wing German parties allowed for military intervention on the basis of humanitarian reasons, while their right-wing counterparts believed in the strategic use of force for foreign policy. The NATO intervention during the later stages of the Yugoslavia Wars demonstrated this movement towards military intervention on the basis of humanitarian reasons. This was voted on by the two major left-wing parties the SPD and The Greens, who voted 75% and 50% in favour of the humanitarian intervention. The use of pacifism has changed as the major German political parties’ ideologies and positions change over time. During the 1990s there was limited agreement on whether the German government should oppose the use of force. However, from the early 2000s, the left-leaning parties have evolved to adopt policies of pacifism and an opposition to participating in the war. While the right-wing Christian-Democratic party has adopted a policy stating that Germany should be capable of defending itself through the use of military force. During this same era, Germany has consolidated its economic and political power over Europe, making the impact of their foreign policy significant. The non-intervention in the Syrian Civil War shows how despite humanitarian intervention allowing for military action, the German government is still unlikely to use military force. With the Annexation of Crimea Russia has shown an aggressive use of military force in their conduct of foreign policy which provides the German Government with difficulties maintaining their pacifist ideology as the breach of human rights has had little impact on the Russian foreign policy, which is considered to be the result of Germany pacifism to some extent.

References

Further reading

 Chickering, Roger. Imperial Germany and a World Without War: The Peace Movement and German Society, 1892-1914 (Princeton University Press, 2015).
 Chickering, Roger Philip. "The Peace Movement and the Religious Community in Germany, 1900–1914." Church history 38.3 (1969): 300-311.

 Davy, Jennifer Anne. "Pacifist thought and gender ideology in the political biographies of women peace activists in Germany, 1899-1970: introduction." Journal of Women's History 13.3 (2001): 34-45.
 Oppenheimer, Andrew. "West German Pacifism and the Ambivalence of Human Solidarity, 1945–1968." Peace & Change 29.3‐4 (2004): 353-389. online

 Ritchie, J. M. "Germany–a peace-loving nation? A Pacifist Tradition in German Literature." Oxford German Studies 11.1 (1980): 76-102.